Instruction and Advice for the Young Bride purports to be a booklet written by Ruth Smythers in 1894 that states that women find sex displeasurable and discusses methods which a newly married woman may use to discourage her husband from sex. Although there is ample evidence that the text is a joke or hoax - Ruth Smythers, her husband and the institutions mentioned in the pamphlet did not exist (names 'Ruth' and 'Smithers' (sic) appear alongside, albeit separately in a once popular work of fiction by John Galsworthy, a 1910 play Justice), and some of the language and reference points were not used until the 20th century - it has fooled some people and even a newspaper into believing it is a serious text, partly because some back covers of the book imply that it is genuine.

The text, purportedly published by Spiritual Guidance Press, New York City and reprinted by The Madison Institute Newsletter, Fall Issue, in 1894, has become a well-known humorous pamphlet.  It has been published in book form as Sex Tips for Husbands and Wives from 1894.

Internet origins 

The text, which has circulated and spread over websites and blogs and has been translated into other languages, is sometimes sourced to a 1998 course on human sexuality in the University of Washington. However, as this was two years after a passage of the book was read out in a legal hearing during the Krull case, this is unlikely.

Krull case 
In 1996, the Ombudsman of King County in Seattle, David Krull, was fired for misconduct after he emailed the text of the booklet to his assistant, Amy Calderwood, who was about to get married. Krull had stated that the email was a light hearted joke, but Calderwood claimed it was "inappropriate", her fiancé said it was "vile" and council member Maggi Fimia, who voted for Krull to be fired, called the text "incredibly offensive". 
Fimia picked out the following passage and said it was suitable only for discussion in a women's studies class:

See also 
 Sexual revolution in 1960s America

References

Bibliography 
 James A. Brundage, Law, sex, and Christian society in medieval Europe, American Council of Learned Societies

External links 
 Instruction and Advice for the Young Bride text at Internet Archive

1996 documents
1996 hoaxes
Literary forgeries
Stereotypes of women